The 2012 Miami Hurricanes football team  represented the University of Miami during the 2012 NCAA Division I FBS football season. It was the Hurricanes' 87th season of football and 9th as a member of the Atlantic Coast Conference. The Hurricanes were led by second-year head coach Al Golden and played their home games at Sun Life Stadium. They finished the season 7–5 overall and 5–3 in the ACC to finish in a three-way tie for first place in the Coastal Division. The Hurricanes served a self-imposed bowl ban due to an ongoing NCAA investigation.

Schedule

Roster
As of October 8, 2012

Depth chart
(Week 7 VS UNC October 13, 2012)

Season summary

NC State

References

Miami
Miami Hurricanes football seasons
Miami Hurricanes football